Michael Nali CBE (born 1961) is a Papua New Guinean politician.  He was the leader of the People's Progress Party from 2002 to 2007 and was Member of Parliament for the electorate of Mendi Open, in Southern Highlands Province, from 1992 until 2007. During this period he held various ministerial positions, including Deputy Prime Minister and Minister for Trade and Industry.  At the 2007 general election he chose to contest the Southern Highlands Provincial electorate, which was won by Anderson Agiru.

He was appointed Commander of the Order of the British Empire (CBE) in the 2008 Birthday Honours.

Footnotes

1961 births
Living people
Members of the National Parliament of Papua New Guinea
Commanders of the Order of the British Empire
People from the Southern Highlands Province
People's Progress Party politicians
Deputy Prime Ministers of Papua New Guinea